This is a list of Telugu-language films produced in the year 1976.

1976

References

1976
Telugu
Telugu films